Oliver Petrusevski was a member of the Special Police Unit in Macedonia. He was killed in action near village of Trebosh in 2001.

See also
 2001 insurgency in the Republic of Macedonia

References

People from Kumanovo
2001 deaths